The Heart Institute, University of São Paulo (Instituto do Coração da Universidade de São Paulo, or InCor) is one of the clinical institutes of the central University's teaching hospital (Hospital das Clínicas da Universidade de São Paulo) and recognized as one of the world's academic and clinical excellence centers in cardiology, cardiovascular medicine and cardiovascular surgery.

References

External links
 Instituto do Coração da Universidade de São Paulo Website

University of São Paulo
Medical and health organisations based in Brazil
Heart disease organizations
Hospitals established in 1963
Educational institutions established in 1963
1963 establishments in Brazil
Research institutes established in 1963